Ali Kabbani (born May 24, 1999), better known as Myth, is an American YouTube live streamer and former professional Fortnite Battle Royale player. Kabbani has over 4.5 million subscribers on his YouTube channel.

Career

2013–2017: Beginnings and rise in popularity 
Kabbani's YouTube account was created on November 3, 2013. He started streaming live on Twitch in 2016 and mainly streamed Paragon, a third-person multiplayer online battle arena developed by Epic Games. Paragon has since been removed. His streams become much more popular when he started streaming Fortnite Battle Royale in the latter half of 2017. At the end of January 2018, Kabbani had over 200,000 followers on Twitch and by the end of June of the same year, the number had increased to over 3.2 million.

2018–2021: Team SoloMid and Apex Legends deal 
Kabbani previously played for Team SoloMid in a team that consisted of himself, Daequan, Darryle "Hamlinz" Hamlin and Juan "CaMiLLs" Camilla (sub). Kabbani joined Team SoloMid in 2018 and served as the captain of his team. Kabbani participated in the Ninja Vegas Tournament in April 2018. Additionally, Kabbani's streams have included a variety of other popular streamers including, Pokimane and summit1g. Kabbani compares Fortnite building/editing mechanics to a shooter version of chess.

Kabbani suggested a new trap he calls a "bouncer trap" which would "send enemies flying out of boxes to protect players during fights".

In March 2019, Ninja was paid $1 million to stream Apex Legends while Kabbani was paid an undisclosed amount. Kabbani played as TSM's team leader in the game Valorant during the Twitch Rivals series.

2021–present: Leaving Team SoloMid and boxing 
As of July 2021, he has over 7.4 million followers and over 158 million views on Twitch.  

On December 28, 2021, Kabbani announced and confirmed on stream that he would not be renewing his contract with TSM, citing the loss of a family environment, upon the departures of friends Bjergsen and Leena.

In July 2022, Kabbani announced an exclusivity contract with YouTube.

On December 11, Kabbani participated in Ludwig Ahgren's chess boxing event titled "Mogul Chessboxing Championship". Kabbani fought and defeated Cherdleys via Checkmate in the sixth round.

On January 24, 2023, it was announced that Kabbani will face Hundar in on Creator Clash 2 on April 15.

Myth has earned a total of $61,833 throughout his career in esports.

Boxing record

Exhibitions

Chessboxing record 

|-  style="background:#CCFFCC;"
| 2022-12-11 || Win ||align=left|Cherdleys||Mogul Chessboxing Championship|| Galen Center, Los Angeles, California, U.S. || Checkmate || 6 ||
|-
| colspan=9 | Legend:

See also 
 List of most-followed Twitch channels

References

American esports players
Living people
Twitch (service) streamers
YouTube streamers
Team SoloMid players
People from Michigan
People from Dearborn, Michigan
Fortnite
1999 births
American YouTubers
Gaming YouTubers
YouTube boxers